Scoreboard, also known as Russ Hodges's Scoreboard, was a sports series aired on the DuMont Television Network on Fridays at 6:30pm ET from 14 April 1948 to 22 April 1949. The 15-minute show was hosted by famous sports announcer Russ Hodges.

Episode status
As with many DuMont series, no episodes are known to exist in any film or television archive.

See also
List of programs broadcast by the DuMont Television Network
List of surviving DuMont Television Network broadcasts
1948-49 United States network television schedule

References

Bibliography
David Weinstein, The Forgotten Network: DuMont and the Birth of American Television (Philadelphia: Temple University Press, 2004) 
Alex McNeil, Total Television, Fourth edition (New York: Penguin Books, 1980) 
Tim Brooks and Earle Marsh, The Complete Directory to Prime Time Network TV Shows, Third edition (New York: Ballantine Books, 1964)

External links
Scoreboard at IMDB
DuMont historical website

1948 American television series debuts
1949 American television series endings
Black-and-white American television shows
Lost television shows
DuMont sports programming